Irina Korina (born 1977, Moscow, Russia) is a Russian installation artist.

Biography 
Graduated from the stage design faculty at the Russian Theater Academy, Moscow, in 2000, and also participated in the Valand Academy Exchange Program in Sweden. From 2002 to 2005 studied at Akademie der Bildende Kunst, Vienna.

Korina has been actively engaged with theatre practice and has had a number of exhibitions since 1999. She was awarded The Debut Prize for drama works in 1999 and also the Soratnik All-Russian Contemporary Art Prize three times in 2006, 2009, and 2012. In 2008 and 2015 Korina became a laureate of the Innovation Prize, the All-Russian State Competition in Contemporary Art, and was also awarded the Terna Award for Contemporary Art in 2012.

References 

 </ref>
 </ref>
 </ref>

External links
 Irina Korina. Humiliated and Elated.

1977 births
Living people
21st-century Russian artists
Russian contemporary artists
Russian women artists